St Andrews railway station, also known as St Andrews Links, Links Station or Old Station, was the first railway station in the town of St Andrews, Fife, Scotland. The station was opened by the St Andrews Railway in 1852. It remained open to passengers until 1887 when a new station was completed closer to the town.

History 
The station opened on 1 July 1852 by the St Andrews Railway. Although the line was built to double track standards, it only carried a single line. Passengers services used this stop for almost 35 years until 1 June 1887 when St Andrews (New) railway station opened. After closure to passenger services, the old station became a goods yard with depot and sidings. A signal box, also called St Andrews Links, opened at the same time to the north of the old station, it took over the operation of the semaphore signalling and sets of points west of the town; the box closed in 1957.

References

External links 

Disused railway stations in Fife
Railway stations in Great Britain opened in 1852
Railway stations in Great Britain closed in 1887
Former North British Railway stations
1852 establishments in Scotland
1887 disestablishments in Scotland